List of prominent Soukous musicians and musical groups:

Antoine Kolosoy, a.k.a. Papa Wendo
Aurlus Mabele
Awilo Longomba
Bozi Boziana
Diblo Dibala
Dindo Yogo
Dr Nico Kasanda
Empire Bakuba 
Evoloko Jocker
Fally Ipupa
Ferre Gola
François Luambo Makiadi, band leader of OK Jazz
Grand Kalle, band leader of Grand Kalle et l'African Jazz
Kanda Bongo Man
Kasaloo Kyanga
King Kester Emeneya 
Koffi Olomide
Les Quatre Étoiles 4 Etoiles
Loketo
Mav Cacharel
M'bilia Bel
Meiway 
Mose Fan Fan
Monique Séka
Nyboma
Oliver N'Goma 
Orchestra Makassy 
Papa Wemba
Pepe Kalle
Quartier Latin International
Les Quatre Étoiles
Remmy Ongala
Rigo Star
Sam Fan Thomas 
Sam Mangwana
Samba Mapangala, band leader of Orchestra Virunga
Tabu Ley Rochereau, band leader of African Fiesta
Tshala Muana
Werrason 
Yondo Sister
Zaiko Langa Langa

African musicians
Soukous